"Life is Motion" is a poem from Wallace Stevens's first book of poetry,  Harmonium. It was first published in 1919, so it is in the public domain.

Overview 

This playful poem is notable for its introducing exclamatory sounds, and for evoking the American frontier and the simple joy of calico-clad Bonnie and Josie. Stevens returns to Oklahoma, the venue for the first poem in Harmonium, "Earthy Anecdote", which charged a local scene with an aura of mystery. "Life is Motion" by contrast reduces locale to basics, suggesting in its own way that the poet must move beyond it as Crispin did in "The Comedian as the Letter C", even as this marriage of flesh and air is celebrated.

A symbolist reading would understand the flesh as reality, the air as imagination. The poem celebrates Stevens's task, to engage his imagination with reality.

A philosophically ambitious reading would view it as a poetic expression of a process philosophy like that of Alfred North Whitehead.

One critic wrote: "Of the modern poets, Wallace Stevens seem to me the most successful creator of artistic experiences which hum with the energy and motion of life."  See also "Metaphors of a Magnifico", where the debt to Cubist studies of motion is particularly evident.

Media

Notes

References 

 Blessing, Richard. "Wallace Stevens and the Necessary Reader: A Technique of Dynamism." In Twentieth Century Literature (1972, Volume 18, Number 4).
 Buttel, Robert. Wallace Stevens: The Making of Harmonium. 1967: Princeton University Press.

1919 poems
American poems
Poetry by Wallace Stevens